Żabianka  is a neighbourhood in the district of Żabianka-Wejhera-Jelitkowo-Tysiąclecia in the city of Gdańsk, Poland. It is located in the northern part of the city, on its border with Sopot.

Population: (together with Jelitkowo, Wejhera i Tysiaclecia) 23,145 inhabitants on area 2.1 km2 (population density 10,923 inhabitants/km2).

Transport
The Gdańsk Żabianka railway station, operated by SKM, is located in Żabianka.

External links
 Map of Żabianka and Jelitkowo

Gdańsk
Neighbourhoods in Poland